The Yulin Caves is a Buddhist cave temple site in Guazhou County, Gansu Province, China. It takes its name from the elm trees lining the Yulin River, which flows through the site and separates the two cliffs from which the caves have been excavated. The site was among the first to be designated for protection in 1961 as a Major National Historical and Cultural Site. In 2008 the Yulin Grottoes were submitted for future inscription on the UNESCO World Heritage List as part of the Chinese Section of the Silk Road.

Caves
Most of the caves take the form of an entrance corridor, antechamber, and main chamber. In three caves, a central pier was left intact during excavation then carved with niches on all four sides. A number of caves were reworked and repainted in later periods, since the site remained in use throughout the Tang, Five Dynasties, Song, Western Xia, and Yuan Dynasties. It fell into disuse during the Ming Dynasty. There were early efforts to restore the caves at the time of the Qing Dynasty and several new caves also date to this period. More recently, under the management of the Dunhuang Academy, the focus has been on preventive conservation through consolidation of the cliff face and controlling access.

Wall paintings
The paintings are Buddhist with some secular scenes, the former including buddhas, bodhisattvas, apsara, and jataka tales; and the latter, donor portraits, go players, representatives of China's ethnic minorities, marked out by their hair styles and dress, farming scenes such as milking a cow, wine-making, a smelting furnace, and a marriage ceremony; depictions of musicians and dancers help break down the distinction between the sacred and the profane. The paintings are not frescoes but instead executed on an earthen render with mineral and organic pigments and gum or glue binders.

List of caves
The forty-two caves are dated as follows, based largely on the style of the paintings and their accompanying inscriptions (in Chinese, Mongolian, Tibetan, Sanskrit, Tangut, and Old Uighur):

See also
 Mogao Caves
 Principles for the Conservation of Heritage Sites in China
 National Heritage Sites in Gansu Province
 International Dunhuang Project
 World Heritage Sites in China

References

External links

 Conservation of Ancient Sites on the Silk Road (1st Conference) (GCI)
 Conservation of Ancient Sites on the Silk Road (2nd Conference) (GCI)
 Images of the Site and the Area (National Institute of Informatics)
  Yulin Caves (Dunhuang Academy)

Buddhist grottoes in Gansu
Chinese painting
Guazhou County
Tang dynasty art
Tang dynasty Buddhist temples
Western Xia architecture
Five Dynasties and Ten Kingdoms
Major National Historical and Cultural Sites in Gansu